Vitrified sand is sand that has been heated to a high enough temperature to undergo vitrification, which is the melting of the silicon dioxide or quartz that compose common sand. Vitrified sand is a type of natural glass, contrasted with manufactured glass in which soda ash or potash are added to lower the melting point. There are several natural processes that produce more or less melted sand and one man-made form:

 fulgurite is sand fused by a lightning bolt hitting sand.
 Impactite such as tektite is sand fused by the compressive heat of a meteor strike including moldavite, a gem quality stone mined in some locations.
frit is partially fused sand plus other chemicals created in the process of glaze and glass making.
Nuclear melt glass, formed by the detonation of a nuclear weapon. Examples include trinitite, created during the Trinity nuclear test

Volcanic glass in many forms is not fused sand because it is formed from molten material.

References

Glass in nature